Camping is a form of outdoor recreation involving overnight stays with a basic temporary shelter such as a tent. Camping can also include a recreational vehicle, a permanent tent, a shelter such as a bivy or tarp, or no shelter at all. Typically, participants leave developed areas to spend time outdoors, in pursuit of activities providing them enjoyment or an educational experience. Spending the night away from home distinguishes camping from day-tripping, picnicking, and other outdoor activities.

Camping as a recreational activity became popular among elites in the early 20th century. With time, it grew in popularity among other socioeconomic classes. Modern campers frequent publicly owned natural resources such as national and state parks, wilderness areas, and commercial campgrounds. In a few countries, such as Sweden and Scotland, public camping is legal on privately held land as well. Camping is a key part of many youth organizations around the world, such as Scouting, which use it to teach both self-reliance and teamwork.

Definition

The Cambridge Academic Content Dictionary defines camping as:

Camping describes a range of activities and approaches to outdoor accommodation. Survivalist and wild campers typically set off with as little as possible to get by.  Other campers might use specialized camping gear designed to provide comfort, including their own power and heat sources as well as camping furniture. Camping may be combined with hiking, as in backpacking, and is often enjoyed in conjunction with other outdoor activities such as canoeing, kayaking, climbing, fishing, and hunting. Fastpacking involves both running and camping.

There is no universally held definition of what is and what is not camping. Just as with motels, which serve both recreational and business guests, the same campground may serve recreational campers, school field trips, migrant workers, and homeless at the same time. Fundamentally, it reflects a combination of intent and the nature of activities involved.  A children's summer camp with dining hall meals and bunkhouse accommodations may have "camp" in its name but fails to reflect the spirit and form of "camping" as it is broadly understood. Similarly, a homeless person's lifestyle may involve many common camping activities, such as sleeping out and preparing meals over a fire but fails to reflect the elective nature and pursuit of spirit rejuvenation that are an integral aspect of camping. Likewise, cultures with itinerant lifestyles or lack of permanent dwellings cannot be said to be "camping" as this is considered their way of life.

History

The history of recreational camping is often traced back to Thomas Hiram Holding, a British travelling tailor, but it was actually first popularised in the UK on the river Thames. By the 1880s, large numbers of visitors took part in the pastime, which was connected to the late Victorian craze for pleasure boating. Although Thomas Hiram Holding is often seen as the father of modern camping in the UK, he was responsible for popularising a different type of camping in the early twentieth century. He experienced the activity in his youth, when he had spent much time with his parents traveling across the American prairies. Later he embarked on a cycling and camping tour with some friends across Ireland. His book on his Ireland experience, Cycle and Camp in Connemara led to the formation of the first camping group in 1901, the Association of Cycle Campers, later to become the Camping and Caravanning Club. He wrote The Campers Handbook in 1908, so that he could share his enthusiasm for the great outdoors with the world.

Possibly the first commercial camping ground in the world was Cunningham's camp, near Douglas, Isle of Man, which opened in 1894. In 1906, the Association of Cycle Campers opened its first own camping site, in Weybridge. By that time the organization had several hundred members. In 1910 the Association was merged into the National Camping Club. Although the First World War was responsible for a certain hiatus in camping activity, the association received a new lease of life after the war when Sir Robert Baden-Powell (founder of the Boy Scouts movement) became its president in 1919.

In the US, camping may be traced to William Henry Harrison Murray's 1869 publication of Camp-Life in the Adirondacks resulting in a flood of visitors to the Adirondacks that summer.

During the early twentieth century, the popularity of camping in the United States grew as a result of the publicity created by The Vagabonds: Henry Ford, Thomas Edison, John Burroughs, and Harvey S. Firestone. This group of famous American businessmen, inventors, and authors traveled for a period of ten years to different states where their trips were highly documented by press from across the country. Oftentimes "...these rough and tumble pioneers would drive toward the Adirondacks and essentially live off the land, camping at farms and buying food along the way just like ordinary Americans out for a holiday on the road."

The International Federation of Camping Clubs (Fédération Internationale de Camping et de Caravanning) was founded in 1932, with national clubs from many countries affiliating with it. By the 1960s, camping had become an established family holiday standard, and today campsites are widespread across Europe and North America.

Types

Different types of camping may be named after their form of transportation, such as canoe camping, car camping, RVing, and backpacking, including ultralight backpacking.

Camping is also labeled by lifestyle: Glamping (glamorous camping) combines camping with the luxury and amenities of a home or hotel, and has its roots in the early 1900s European and American safaris in Africa. Workamping allows campers to trade their labor variously for discounts on campsite fees, campground utilities, and even some degree of pay. Migrant camps are formed not for recreation, but as a temporary housing arrangement. Campgrounds for custom harvesters in the United States may include room to park combines and other large farm equipment.
Camping is also popular at air shows, notably at the Oshkosh air show where people often camp in a small tent under their aircraft's wing.

Equipment

The equipment used in camping varies with by intended activity. For instance, in survival camping the equipment consists of small items which have the purpose of helping the camper in providing food, heat and safety. The equipment used in this type of camping must be lightweight and it is restricted to the mandatory items. Other types of camping such as winter camping involve having specially designed equipment in terms of tents or clothing which is strong enough to protect the camper's body from the wind and cold.

Survival camping involves certain items that campers are recommended to have with them in case something goes wrong and they need to be rescued. A survival kit includes mandatory items which are small and must fit in one's pocket or which otherwise could be carried on one's person. This kit is useless in these circumstances if it is kept in the backpack that is left in camp. Such a kit should include a small metal container which can be used to heat water over a campfire, a small length of duct tape which can prove useful in many situations, and an emergency space blanket. These blankets are specially designed to occupy minimal space and are perfect for making emergency shelters, keeping the camper warm. Also because of the aluminum-like color this blanket is reflective which means it can be easily seen from an aircraft. Candle stubs are good in starting a fire as well as in warming an enclosed space. One or two band-aids are mandatory in this type of camping. Any camper, and not only the survival ones, need waterproof matches or a lighter and a large safety pin or fish hook which can be used in fishing. Rubber gloves, antiseptic wipes, tinfoil, jackknife, or halazone tablets (which purify the water) are also to be included into a survival kit. Although these seem too many items to be carried on one person, they are in fact small, lightweight and definitely useful.

Winter camping can be dangerous without respecting the basic rules when it comes to this particular activity.

List of common equipment

The following is a list of commonly used camping equipment:
 First aid kit
 Tent, lean-to, or other form of shelter
 Hammer or mallet to drive tent stakes into the soil (hammer are often a claw hammer, which is also helpful for removing them)
 Sleeping bag and/or blankets for warmth
 Sleeping pad or air mattress to be placed underneath the sleeping bag for cushioning from stones and twigs, as well as for insulation from the ground
 Lantern or flashlight
 Hatchet, axe or saw for cutting firewood for a campfire
 Fire starter for starting a campfire
 Folding chairs for placement around a campfire
 Ropes for stringing clothes line and for securing the shelter
 Tarp for adding an additional layer of storm protection to a tent, and to shelter dining areas
 Raincoat or poncho
 Hiking boots
 Fishing pole
 Canteen (bottle)
 Chuck box to hold camp kitchen items for food preparation, consumption, and cleanup
 Trash bags, for the handling of waste; see leave no trace
 Cathole trowel for sanitation in areas where a toilet is not provided
 Insect repellent 
 Sunscreen for protecting the skin
 Personal care products and towel
 Cooler to store perishables and beverages. If electricity is available, a thermoelectric or stirling engine cooler can be used without the need for ice. Campers at modern campgrounds will normally bring perishable foods in coolers while backcountry campers will bring non-perishable foods such as dried fruits, nuts, jerky, and MREs.
 Bottled water or portable water filter for areas that have access to rivers or lakes
 Cooking implements such as a tripod chained grill, Dutch oven, or La Cotta clay pot can be used for cooking on a campfire. A portable stove can be used where campfires are forbidden or impractical. If using a campground with electricity, an electric frying pan or slow cooker can be used.
 Firewood for campfires
 Emergency Preparedness Kit
 Multi-Tool or knife
 Global Positioning System (GPS)

Much of the remaining needed camping equipment is commonly available in the home, including: dishes, pots, and pans; however, many people opt not to use their home items, but instead utilize equipment better tailored for camping. These amenities include heavy plastic tableware and salt and pepper shakers with tops that close in order to shelter the shakers from rain. Old kitchen gear purchased from thrift stores or garage sales may also be used in place of home items as an alternative to buying specialized (and more expensive) camping equipment. Backpackers use lightweight and portable equipment.

Campgrounds and commercial campsites

Campers span a broad range of age, ability, and ruggedness, and campsites are designed in many ways as well. Many campgrounds have sites with facilities such as fire rings, barbecue grills, utilities, shared bathrooms and laundry, as well as access to nearby recreational facilities, however, not all campsites have similar levels of development. Campsites can range from a patch of dirt, to a level, paved pad with sewer and electricity with many public and private campgrounds also offering cabin options. (For more information on facilities, see the campsite and RV park articles.)

Other vehicles used for camping include motorcycles, touring bicycles, boats, canoes, pack animals, and even bush planes; although backpacking on foot is a popular alternative.

Tent camping sites often cost less than campsites with full amenities, and most allow direct access by car. Some "walk-in" sites lie a short walk away from the nearest road, but do not require full backpacking equipment. Those who seek a rugged experience in the outdoors prefer to camp with only tents, or with no shelter at all ("under the stars").

Popularity

United States
According to an infographic produced by Red Rover Camping and based on data from the 2014 American Camper Report published by the Coleman Company, Inc. and the Outdoor Foundation, camping in the United States is gaining popularity after a fall of 4.2 million participants from 2011 to 2012.

United Kingdom
According to data provided by the Great British Tourism Survey conducted by Visit England, almost 4.5 million camping and caravanning holidays were taken by British residents during the first half of 2015, for an average of 3.7 nights. As in the United States, camping is gaining popularity, with an 8% increase in trips compared to the same period in 2014. The Caravan Club and the Camping and Caravanning Club represent UK campers.

Scotland allows "wild camping" on privately-owned wilderness.

France
Data collected by the Fédération Nationale De L'Hôtellerie De Plein Air (FNHPA) shows that around 113 million nights were taken at French campsites in 2015, which was up by 3.9% on the same period in 2014. French holidaymakers took 77 million of these, and the rest was made up of other nationalities, the majority of whom were Dutch, German and UK tourists. The French Government hopes to have 100 million tourists each year by 2030. The most popular region for camping is Languedoc and Roussillon with around 19,331,663 nights spent at campsites during 2015, whilst the department with the most campsites is the Vendée.

Canada 

Canada is a country that has four different seasons throughout the year. In this day and age, with the proper camping equipment, it is possible to camp all over Canada all year around. At the end of the 19th century, Canada started establishing areas all over the territory to be later named "National Parks".  These days, the parks are now known for being some of the most popular campgrounds in the country. But it wasn't always accessible to everyone. In Canada, before the 1910s, camping was reserved only for men. The first camping ground to be established in a National Park in Canada was in 1964 at the Lake Louise.

According to data by a study made by Camping Québec in 2016, 20% of the province of Québec did go camping, that being about 1,600,000 people. In the same research, the study has shown that a certain 8 % of those campers were strangers. The popularity of camping in Canada is not only for locals, but also for travelers. About 34 % of the camp fanatics in Québec are camping on either National Parks or Provincials Parks.

Camping and public access
Camping on open land, regardless of ownership, is legal in a few countries, including Sweden and Scotland. In Sweden, a right of public access – allowing outdoor recreational activity on privately held wilderness – is enshrined in the constitution. Large groups, however, must obtain the landowner's permission. In Scotland, people may camp on most unenclosed land, whether state- or privately owned. There is however a "leave-no-trace" policy and a common-law outdoor-access code.

In popular culture
Many films and other media have focused on camping or portrayed events regarding camping. Music includes the c. 1962 Phil Ochs album, Camp Favorites.

See also
 Backpacking with animals
 Bell tent
 Swag
 Bow drill
 Camping food
 Firelighting
 Hammock camping
 Outdoor cooking
 Tarp tent
 Wilderness acquired diarrhea
 Overlanding

Further reading 

 Jeff Guinn, The Vagabonds: The Story of Henry Ford and Thomas Edison's Ten-Year Road Trip (New York: Simon & Schuster, 2019). https://www.amazon.com/Vagabonds-Story-Thomas-Edisons-Ten-Year/dp/1501159305

References

External links

 Images of historic camping and hiking on the Long Trail, Center for Digital Initiatives, University of Vermont Library
 Reflections of Summer: Car Camping!  Video produced by Oregon Field Guide
 Letter from Henry Ford to Thomas Edison thanking him for including his family on a camping trip.

 
Procedural knowledge
Scoutcraft
Survival skills
Types of tourism

eu:Kanpin